Raphidascarididae is a family of roundworms (also known as nematodes) in the order Ascaridida. It encompasses nine genera, including Hysterothylacium, which parasitize marine fish, and Raphidascaris. The family contains over 190 species.

References

Ascaridida
Nematodes